Del Kathryn Barton (born 11 December 1972) is an Australian artist who began drawing at a young age, and studied at UNSW Art & Design (formerly the College of Fine Arts) at the University of New South Wales. She soon became known for her psychedelic fantasy works which she has shown in solo and group exhibitions across Australia and overseas. In 2008 and 2013 she won the Archibald Prizes for portraiture presented by the Art Gallery of New South Wales. In 2015 her animated film Oscar Wilde’s The Nightingale and the Rose won the Film Victoria Erwin Rado Award for Best Australian Short Film.

Early life 
Barton grew up in the bush-land of the lower Blue Mountains west of Sydney Australia, often living in sheds or tents with her hippie-like parents. Barton suffered depression as a child, and art became her therapy. She  drew obsessively from an early age and lived in her imagination.

Her early subjects included fairies, animals, nature, and maps. She also drew the female form, occasionally using her mother to pose for her nude works, other times copying work from published magazines.

In 1990, she entered into the College of Fine Arts of the University of New South Wales, as an already accomplished artist with a wide repertoire of subjects.  Her tutor during this time, whom she recalled as a “fantastic teacher”, was Michael Esson. After graduating with a Bachelor of Fine Arts in 1993 the artist was employed as a lecturer at CoFA from 1994-96.

Career
She held her first exhibition in 1995, and has gone on to hold numerous solo exhibitions in Sydney and Melbourne.

Her solo exhibitions include: The Nightingale and the Rose, Australian Centre for the Moving Image (ACMI), Melbourne, Australia (2016); the highway is a disco, ARNDT, Singapore (2015); Electro Orchid, Roslyn Oxley9 Gallery, Sydney (2014); The Nightingale and the Rose, Heide Museum of Modern Art (2012); the stars eat your body, Kaliman Gallery, Sydney (2009); the whole of everything, Karen Woodbury Gallery, Melbourne (2008) and thank you for loving me, Karen Woodbury Gallery, Melbourne (2005).

On 7 March 2008, it was announced that Barton had won the 2008 Archibald Prize for portraiture, for You are what is most beautiful about me, a self portrait with Kell and Arella, a self-portrait with her two children. Barton said of the portrait: "This painting celebrates the love I have for my two children and how my relationship with them has radically informed and indeed transformed my understanding of who I am". A key inspiration for Barton is her experience of motherhood. In 2013, she won the Archibald Prize for her portrait of actor Hugo Weaving. Of portraiture generally, she says: "I really value the discipline" that it brings.

She was also an Archibald Prize finalist in 2008, 2013 and 2018.

She is represented by Roslyn Oxley9 Gallery in Sydney.

Del Kathryn Barton has participated in group exhibitions that include: Like-ness, Albertz Benda, New York, USA (2016); Express Yourself: Romance Was Born for Kids, National Gallery of Victoria, Melbourne (2014); Dark Heart, Adelaide Biennale of Australian Art, Adelaide (2014); Theatre of the World, Museum of Old and New Art, Tasmania (2012); Lightness and Gravity, Queensland Gallery of Modern Art, Queensland (2012); Freehand: Recent Australia Drawing, Heide Museum of Modern Art, Melbourne (2010/11); 2009 Wynne Prize for Landscape, Art Gallery of New South Wales, Sydney (2009); Half a World Away: Drawings from Glasgow, Sao Paulo and Sydney, Hallwalls Contemporary Arts Center, Buffalo, New York (2002).

Barton produced the animated film Oscar Wilde’s The Nightingale and the Rose, which celebrated its world premiere at the 65th Berlin International Film Festival in 2015 and was shown at the 2015 Melbourne International Film Festival . The movie won the Film Victoria Erwin Rado Award for Best Australian Short Film. As a result of the film, in 2015 she was also she was awarded an Australian Film, Television and Radio School Creative Fellowship.

In 2020 her sculptural work, the infinite adjustment of the throat...and then, a smile, was shown in Part One of the exhibition, "Know my name: Australian women artists 1900 to now" at the National Gallery of Australia.

Artistic practice 
Barton's paintings are fantasy-like and include female figures merged with flowers and plants.  Historically flowers have often been used to represent femininity and female genitalia.  In later works she included photographic images of male figures.

Many works are digital collages and she often incorporates gouache, glitter, sequins and markers.

Barton begins a work by making a drawing, perhaps of an emotion, gesture or image from a dream.  She then develops the drawings into a highly patterned paintings, working on more than one painting at a time.  Each work takes several months to complete.

Movies 
In 2022 her debut movie Blaze was released. It tells a story about traumatized young girl with a vivid imagination. Del Kathryn Barton was a director and a co-writer of the script.

Del Kathryn Barton and Huna Amweero won Best Feature Film - Original for their feature film script Blaze at the 2022 AWGIE Awards. The script was shortlisted for the 2023 Betty Roland Prize for Scriptwriting at the New South Wales Premier's Literary Awards.

Collections 
Del Kathryn Barton is represented in galleries across Australia:

 National Gallery of Australia, four prints in her series 'that's when I was another tree' from 2007

 National Gallery of Victoria, Melbourne

 Art Gallery of New South Wales, Sydney

 QAGOMA (Queensland Art Gallery and Gallery of Modern Art), Brisbane

 Art Gallery of South Australia, Adelaide

Publications

References

Images
 Del Kathryn Barton 2008 exhibition Karen Woodbury Gallery, Melbourne
 Del Kathryn Barton 2005 exhibition Karen Woodbury Gallery, Melbourne

Video
 Del Kathryn Barton, Wilderness exhibition
 Behind the scenes of ARTIST PROFILE Issue 15's cover shoot, inside Barton's studio

External links
 Del Kathryn Barton interview with Owen Craven, 2011, ARTIST PROFILE Issue 15, pp. 52–60
 Karen Woodbury Gallery, Melbourne, Australia
 Del Kathryn Barton on Artabase
 The Australian, Del Kathryn Barton
 The Sydney Morning Herald, Del Kathryn Barton
 The Age, Del Kathryn Barton
 Art & Australia, Emerging artists, Del Kathryn Barton
 Arndt Fine Art Singapore, Del Kathryn Barton
 the highway is a disco, Del Kathryn Barton, Arndt Fine Art
 Publication, Del Kathryn Barton, Julie Ewington
 The Nightingale and The Rose, Oscar Wilde, Del Kathryn Barton
 Karen Woodbury Gallery Publications, Melbourne, Australia

1972 births
Living people
Archibald Prize winners
University of New South Wales College of Fine Arts alumni
Australian women painters
Artists from Sydney
Archibald Prize finalists
21st-century Australian women artists
21st-century Australian artists
20th-century Australian women artists
20th-century Australian artists